Girolamo Rossi may refer to:

Girolamo Rossi (composer) (fl. Naples 1733-1768)
Girolamo Rossi (engraver) (born 1680) Rome